Joanne Hort is a New Zealand food science academic, and as of 2019 is a full professor at the Massey University and holds the 'Fonterra Riddet Chair in Consumer and Sensory Science'.

Academic career

After a 1997 PhD titled  'Cheddar cheese : Its texture, chemical composition and rheological properties'  at the Sheffield Hallam University, Hort moved to University of Nottingham, rising to full professor. Hort then moved to Massey University, where she currently (2019) teaches.

Hort's research focuses on the taste and texture of foods, particularly dairy products.

Selected works 
 Kemp, Sarah E., Tracey Hollowood, and Joanne Hort. Sensory evaluation: a practical handbook. John Wiley & Sons, 2011.
 Hort, Joanne, and Geoff Le Grys. "Developments in the textural and rheological properties of UK Cheddar cheese during ripening." International Dairy Journal 11, no. 4-7 (2001): 475–481.
 Bayarri, Sara, Andrew J. Taylor, and Joanne Hort. "The role of fat in flavor perception: effect of partition and viscosity in model emulsions." Journal of agricultural and food chemistry 54, no. 23 (2006): 8862–8868.
 Hort, Joanne, and Tracey Ann Hollowood. "Controlled continuous flow delivery system for investigating taste− aroma interactions." Journal of Agricultural and Food Chemistry 52, no. 15 (2004): 4834–4843.
 Marciani, Luca, Johann C. Pfeiffer, Joanne Hort, Kay Head, Debbie Bush, Andy J. Taylor, Robin C. Spiller, Sue Francis, and Penny A. Gowland. "Improved methods for fMRI studies of combined taste and aroma stimuli." Journal of neuroscience methods 158, no. 2 (2006): 186–194.

References

Living people
New Zealand women academics
Year of birth missing (living people)
Alumni of Sheffield Hallam University
Academics of the University of Nottingham
Academic staff of the Massey University
Women food scientists
New Zealand food scientists
English emigrants to New Zealand
New Zealand women writers